The Lower Cape May Regional High School (LCMRHS) is a four-year comprehensive public high school located in Lower Township, in Cape May County, New Jersey, United States, operating as part of the Lower Cape May Regional School District. LCMRHS serves students in ninth through twelfth grades from four communities in Cape May County as part of the Lower Cape May Regional School District, which includes Lower Township, Cape May, West Cape May, and Cape May Point; students from Cape May Point attend the district as part of a sending/receiving relationship.

As of the 2021–22 school year, the school had an enrollment of 764 students and 68.5 classroom teachers (on an FTE basis), for a student–teacher ratio of 11.2:1. There were 204 students (26.7% of enrollment) eligible for free lunch and 47 (6.2% of students) eligible for reduced-cost lunch.

History
LCMRHS replaced the former Cape May High School, which closed effective December 22, 1960. The Cape May superintendent, Paul W. Schmitdtchen, decided to create a new high school, and therefore he is considered the "father" of the school. In December 1958 the voters of Cape May City, West Cape May, and Lower Township approved borrowing $1.4 million (equivalent to $ million in ) to build a new high school in Lower Township. Construction began in November 1959. The school district hired employees in April 1960. LCMRHS opened in 1961. The first class to graduate from LCMRHS was that of 1961.

Th school's field house opened in 2017.

Campus
The LCMR district describes its facilities as being in Erma, with the postal address being "Cape May, New Jersey"; the schools are not in the Erma census-designated place. The Cape May County Herald, and the Press of Atlantic City describe the school as being in Erma.

The school has a capacity of 1,266 students.

Awards, recognition and rankings
The school was the 236th-ranked public high school in New Jersey out of 339 schools statewide in New Jersey Monthly magazine's September 2014 cover story on the state's "Top Public High Schools", using a new ranking methodology. The school had been ranked 243rd in the state of 328 schools in 2012, after being ranked 236th in 2010 out of 322 schools listed. The magazine ranked the school 205th in 2008 out of 316 schools. The school was ranked 185th in the magazine's September 2006 issue, which surveyed 316 schools across the state.

Athletics
The Lower Cape May Regional High School Caper Tigers compete in the Atlantic Division of the Cape-Atlantic League, an athletic conference comprised of both parochial and public high schools located in Atlantic, Cape May, Cumberland and Gloucester counties, and operates under the aegis of the New Jersey State Interscholastic Athletic Association (NJSIAA). With 594 students in grades 10-12, the school was classified by the NJSIAA for the 2022–24 school years as Group II South for most athletic competition purposes. The football team competes in the Royal Division of the 94-team West Jersey Football League superconference and was classified by the NJSIAA as Group II South for football for 2022–2024.

The boys' wrestling team won the South Jersey Group III state sectional championship in 1982.

In 2015, the girls' basketball team won the South Jersey Group II state sectional title with a 58-55 overtime win over Sterling High School, earning the program's first state championship.

Administration
The school's principal is Lawrence Ziemba. His core administration team includes two vice principals. The athletic director is Erik K. Simonsen.

Student body
In 2012 there were 85 students of LCMR High living in Cape May City. In 2013 this number fell to 65.

Notable alumni
 Bob Andrzejczak (born 1986, class of 2004), politician, member of the New Jersey General Assembly.
 Thomas Cannuli, (born 1992, class of 2010), professional poker player, known for finishing 6th place in the 2015 WSOP Main Event and winning a WSOP bracelet in the $3,333 WSOP.com ONLINE No-Limit Hold'em High Roller.
 Chris Jay (born 1978, class of 1996), musician, screenwriter, actor and member of the band, Army of Freshmen.
 Bill Pilczuk (born 1971, class of 1989), former 1998 World Champion swimmer and present head swim coach at Savannah College of Art and Design.
 Matt Szczur (born 1989, class of 2007), former Major League Baseball player who played for the Chicago Cubs and San Diego Padres.

Notable faculty
 Ed Rubbert (born 1964), former football coach who played quarterback for the Washington Redskins.

References

Further reading

External links 

Lower Cape May Regional High School

Data for the Lower Cape May Regional High School District, National Center for Education Statistics
South Jersey Sports: Lower Cape May HS

Cape May, New Jersey
Cape May Point, New Jersey
Lower Township, New Jersey
Public high schools in Cape May County, New Jersey
West Cape May, New Jersey
Educational institutions established in 1961
1961 establishments in New Jersey